The 2009 South American Artistic Gymnastics Championships were held in Sogamoso, Colombia October 28–November 2, 2009. This was the 9th edition of the South American Artistic Gymnastics Championships for senior gymnasts.

Participating nations

Medalists

Medal table

References

2009 in gymnastics
South American Gymnastics Championships
International gymnastics competitions hosted by Colombia
2009 in Colombian sport